Kopiko is an Indonesian brand of coffee confectioneries originally produced in Indonesia by Mayora Indah. It is named after the kōpiko coffee bean, found in Hawaii.

Kopiko Coffee Candy is currently available in over 80 countries around the world.

There used to be a widely available second variety of the candies which were kosher, supervised by the KF Kosher Federation in London, though it is no longer being produced. Kosher Kopiko candies can still be found in Israel, however. 

Kopiko has also been consumed by astronauts on the International Space Station.

Ingredients

The product contains extract from real coffee beans. Ingredients include sugar, glucose, vegetable oil (palm oil and/or coconut oil), coffee extract (4.9%), butter, soy lecithin, caramel color, salt, and natural coffee flavor.

Flavors

Two different flavors are available: original coffee and cappuccino.

Caffeine Content
The Kopiko UK website advises that "4–5 sweets contain the caffeine equivalent of a cup of espresso" for the original coffee flavor, while the cappuccino flavor sweets contain "around half the caffeine" of the original coffee flavor.

The Caffeine Informer website estimates the caffeine content of the original coffee flavor to be "about 20–25 mg per piece since usually a cup of coffee is referring to 100 mg of caffeine."

Products

Kopiko Candy
Original
Cappuccino

Kopiko Coffee Flavors
Kopiko Black
Kopiko Brown
Kopiko L.A. (Low Acidic)
Kopiko Blanca (formerly Cafe Blanca)
Kopiko Cappuccino
Kopiko Caramelo

References

External links 
 Brand information of Kopiko Candy
 Brand information of Kopiko Coffee

Brand name confectionery
Indonesian brands
Products introduced in 1990
Mayora Indah brands
Coffee brands
Coffee in Indonesia